Thomas Fanshawe (1580–1631) was an English politician.

Thomas Fanshawe may also refer to:

Thomas Fanshawe (of Jenkins) (1607–1651), English politician, son of the above
Thomas Fanshawe (1628–1705), English politician, member of parliament for Essex, son of the above
Thomas Fanshawe, 1st Viscount Fanshawe (1596–1665), English politician
Thomas Fanshawe (remembrancer of the exchequer) (1533–1601), member of the English Parliament
Thomas Fanshawe, 2nd Viscount Fanshawe (1632–1674), Irish peer and member of parliament